6090 Aulis, provisional designation: , is a Jupiter trojan from the Greek camp, approximately  in diameter. It was discovered on 27 February 1989, by Belgian astronomer Henri Debehogne at ESO's La Silla Observatory in northern Chile. The dark Jovian asteroid belongs to the 50 largest Jupiter trojans and has a rotation period of 18.5 hours. It was named for the ancient Greek port Aulis, mentioned in the Iliad.

Orbit and classification 

Aulis is a dark Jovian asteroid orbiting in the leading Greek camp at Jupiter's  Lagrangian point, 60° ahead of the Gas Giant's orbit in a 1:1 resonance . It is also a non-family asteroid in the Jovian background population.

It orbits the Sun at a distance of 5.0–5.6 AU once every 12 years and 3 months (4,470 days; semi-major axis of 5.31 AU). Its orbit has an eccentricity of 0.06 and an inclination of 20° with respect to the ecliptic. The body's observation arc begins with a precovery taken at Palomar Observatory in March 1954, almost 35 years prior to its official discovery observation.

Numbering and naming 

This minor planet was numbered on 19 September 1994. On 14 May 2021, the object was named by the Working Group Small Body Nomenclature (WGSBN) for the ancient Greek port Aulis, mentioned in the Iliad. In Greek mythology, it was the place where the Greek fleet gathered to set off for Troy and where King Agamemnon had sacrificed his daughter Iphigenia.

Physical characteristics 

Aulis is an assumed C-type asteroid. Its V–I color index of 0.98 is typical for that of most Jovian D-types, the dominant spectral type among the larger Jupiter trojans.

Rotation period 

Italian astronomer Stefano Mottola obtained two concurring rotational lightcurves from photometric observations. In June 1994, together with astronomer Anders Erikson, he constructed a lightcurve from observations made with the 0.9-meter Dutch telescope at La Silla, showing a rotation period of  hours and a brightness variation of  magnitude.

Diameter and albedo 

According to the space-based surveys carried out by the Infrared Astronomical Satellite IRAS, the Japanese Akari satellite, and the NEOWISE mission of NASA's Wide-field Infrared Survey Explorer, Aulis measures between 59.57 and 81.92 kilometers in diameter and its surface has an albedo between 0.046 and 0.087. The Collaborative Asteroid Lightcurve Link adopts an albedo of 0.0553 from IRAS, and derives a similar diameter of 74.53 kilometers based on an absolute magnitude of 9.4.

References

External links 
 Asteroid Lightcurve Database (LCDB), query form (info )
 Discovery Circumstances: Numbered Minor Planets (5001)-(10000) – Minor Planet Center
 Asteroid (6090) 1989 DJ at the Small Bodies Data Ferret
 
 

006090
Discoveries by Henri Debehogne
Named minor planets
19890227